Anıl Koç (born 29 January 1995) is a footballer who plays as a left midfielder for Turkish club Manisa. Born in Belgium, he has represented both that nation and Turkey at youth international levels.

Career 
He made his Belgian Pro League debut on 25 January 2013.

In January 2014 Koç signed on loan for Championship side Charlton Athletic until the end of the 2013–14 season. However, he didn't make a single appearance for Charlton before his loan spell expired.

References

External links 
 
 
 
 

1995 births
People from Saint-Josse-ten-Noode
Footballers from Brussels
Belgian people of Turkish descent
Living people
Turkish footballers
Turkey youth international footballers
Belgian footballers
Belgium youth international footballers
Association football midfielders
Standard Liège players
Charlton Athletic F.C. players
Sint-Truidense V.V. players
FC Eindhoven players
Antalyaspor footballers
FK Atlantas players
Altınordu F.K. players
Kasımpaşa S.K. footballers
Manisa FK footballers
Belgian Pro League players
Challenger Pro League players
Eerste Divisie players
A Lyga players
TFF First League players
Süper Lig players
Turkish expatriate footballers
Belgian expatriate footballers
Expatriate footballers in England
Turkish expatriate sportspeople in England
Belgian expatriate sportspeople in England
Expatriate footballers in the Netherlands
Turkish expatriate sportspeople in the Netherlands
Belgian expatriate sportspeople in the Netherlands
Expatriate footballers in Lithuania
Turkish expatriate sportspeople in Lithuania
Belgian expatriate sportspeople in Lithuania